Kim Jin-tae (Hangul: 김진태; born December 19, 1980), better known by his stage name Verbal Jint (Hangul: 버벌진트), is a South Korean rapper, record producer and musician who is known for his groundbreaking innovations in Korean hip hop rhyme schemes. He established himself as one of South Korea's most popular underground rappers of the 2000s before achieving mainstream success. He is signed to the hip hop record label Brand New Music, under which he runs his own independent label, Otherside.

Impact 
Before Verbal Jint's official debut in 2001, Korean hip hop lacked a fundamental component of rap, the rhyming. Verbal Jint later said in an interview with the Korea Times, "People who came before us didn't have much interest in rhyming; artists before us were satisfied with talking fast and thinking that it was rapping – and that sold then." Verbal Jint's debut mini-album, Modern Rhymes, introduced new innovations in achieving the grammatical accuracy needed to arrange Korean successfully into rhymes. He was the first to create actual rhyme schemes in Korean and his method is now the standard for Korean rapping within the hip hop scene. The rhyme work and flow of his music have been considered revolutionary within the Korean music industry as they have rapidly changed the construction of Korean hip hop music and thus its style and lyrical qualities.

Early life and education 
Verbal Jint was born in Seoul, South Korea. He attended Hanyoung Foreign Language High School, earned an economics degree from Seoul National University, and is currently taking time off from pursuing a law degree at the Hanyang University School of Law.

Verbal Jint completed his mandatory military service for South Korea in the KATUSA program, where Korean soldiers who demonstrate a high level of English fluency and aptitude serve alongside United States Army forces in South Korea.

Career

1999–2008: Underground beginnings and hip hop innovation 
Verbal Jint began his rap career as a member of the Korean hip hop crew "Show N Prove" (SNP) and released his first solo songs in 1999, including, "Big Brag," "How High School," and "Foul." He released his first mini-album, Modern Rhymes, in 2001. The album is credited with introducing rhyme schemes into Korean rapping.

It was several years until Verbal Jint's next releases, 2007's Favorite and 무명. The following year, he formed the hip hop crew Overclass with rappers Warmman and Lobotomy, among others. Notable rappers and singers including San E, Swings, and Urban Zakapa would later join the crew.

2009–2011: Brand New Music and breaking into the mainstream
Verbal Jint experienced his first mainstream success in 2009, when his 2008 album, Framed, won Best Hip Hop Album at the Korean Music Awards. In 2010, he began releasing music under Brand New Stardom, a record label owned by rappers Cho PD and Rhymer. When the company split in two in 2011, Verbal Jint followed Rhymer to his new label Brand New Music.

In 2011, Verbal Jint collaborated with Swings, San-E, L.E.O., Baby Bu, Dawn, and designer Brownbreath on the song, "Stand Up, Japan!," with all proceeds from the digital single donated to help relief efforts after the Japanese Tohoku tsunami.

Later that year, he released the album Go Easy, and its single, "You Look Good," ultimately reached No. 5 on the Gaon Digital Chart. He promoted the single in October on music program You Hee Yeol's Sketchbook, where he also discussed his side-career as a voice actor in commercials. He also performed the song in Japan as a guest at actor and singer Jang Keun-suk's Tokyo Dome concert on November 26.

Verbal Jint held his first solo concert, "You Look Happier," in December 2011. The same month, he made his first appearance on the music show M! Countdown.

2012–2014: Collaborations and first world tour

In June 2012, Verbal Jint appeared in the first season of Mnet's hip hop reality program "Show Me the Money." His team, composed of himself and rookie rapper Go Young Bin, was eliminated in the second round after a performing a hip hop version of miss A's "Breathe."

That same month, he released the album, 10 Years of Misinterpretation. The album singles, "Good Morning," and "Pretty Enough" were hits, reaching No. 5 and No. 6, respectively, on the Gaon Digital Chart. He performed "Good Morning" in a special collaboration with the band 10cm in July at the two-day Green Groove Festival in Boryeong, alongside After School, Son Dambi, Wonder Girls and Akon.

Verbal Jint participated in several successful collaborations in 2013, including the hit singles "If It Ain't Love" featuring Ailee, "Hello" by legendary singer Cho Yong-pil, "Take Care of Christmas" with Shin Seung Hun, and a cover of Deux's "Only For You" with Bumkey. He also collaborated live with girl group Girl's Day at the Mnet 20's Choice Awards in July, and with Bumkey and San E at the SBS Gayo Daejun awards in December. That year, he fulfilled his long-time wish to collaborate with Hyolyn of SISTAR when she surprised him with an unscheduled appearance on You Hee Yeol's Sketchbook and subsequently featured in his performance of "You Look Good."

In May 2014, Verbal Jint went on a world tour with Bumkey, Beenzino, Kanto, and Hwayoung, holding concerts in New York City, Seattle, Los Angeles, and Sydney. He had planned to release a new album, entitled GO HARD Pt. 1: The OTHER SIDE prior to the tour, but he postponed the album's release indefinitely due to the Sewol Ferry Disaster. Later that year, a music video he featured in was delayed due to another disaster. He was featured along with Beenzino, Bobby, BI and Mino in Epik High's single "Born Hater" off their eighth studio album Shoebox. The music video was scheduled for pre-release on October 17, but was delayed one day to pay respect to the victims of the Pangyo Techno Valley vent collapse. The song received a 19+ rating for profanity and deemed inappropriate for broadcasting by KBS on their media channels. However, the song was a success and reached No. 3 on the Gaon Digital Chart.

Later that year, Verbal Jint featured on "Rainstorm by Rainstone," a collaborative track with producer Rainstone, American R&B singer Brian McKnight, and San E.

2015–present: Show Me The Money and starting a new label 
In 2015, Verbal Jint made his first appearance on the TV variety show Running Man in a "hip hop star special" with Jay Park, Jessi, and other rappers. He continued his variety show appearances that summer as a judge on the 4th season of Mnet's hip hop reality program Show Me the Money, where he represented record label Brand New Music alongside San E. He featured on charted singles from show contestants Black Nut and Basick, the latter of whom won the season as part of "Team Brand New Music." After the show's finale, Verbal Jint performed with the judges and contestants from the season in a world tour in South Korea and the United States. Later that year, he appeared on seasons one and two of Show Me the Money spin-off Unpretty Rapstar, during which he produced several singles for contestants.

Verbal Jint released two albums in 2015. On August 31, he released the mini-album Yeoja with Sanchez of the hip-hop trio Phantom. And, after three years of preparation, he released the album GO HARD Pt. 1: The OTHER SIDE on December 19. He also featured on several singles, including Girls' Generation's Taeyeon's solo debut's title track "I," which ranked number one across eight different real time music charts shortly after its release on October 7.

In November 2015, Brand New Music representatives announced that Verbal Jint plans to start an independent label while continuing to promote under Brand New Music.

Voice actor work 
In addition to his career as a rapper, Verbal Jint has provided voiceovers and narration for many TV shows and advertisements. His voice has appeared in South Korean TV commercials for brands including Vitamin Water, LG, and Hyundai.

Discography

Studio albums

Special albums

 Framed Afterplay (누명 Afterplay) (2008)
 Yanggachi Instrumentals (양가치 Instrumentals) (2015)
 17 Acapellas (2017)
 Is It Music or Is It a Report? Instrumentals (이것은 음악인가 업무보고서인가 Instrumentals) (2019)
 Year End Report Instrumentals (연말결산보고서 Instrumentals) (2019)
 20 Acapellas (2020)
 Inflection Point Instrumentals (변곡점 Instrumentals) (2021)
 Inflection Point Acapellas (변곡점 Acapellas) (2021)

Extended plays

Singles

Other charted songs

Filmography

Variety shows

Awards

Notes

References

External links
 Official website

Rappers from Seoul
South Korean male rappers
South Korean singer-songwriters
Living people
1980 births
South Korean hip hop record producers
Brand New Music artists
South Korean male singer-songwriters